Employees in Minnesota are allowed time off from work to vote on the morning of Election Day. Minnesota is also one of the first states to adopt same-day registration in the 1970s. Minnesota is known for a politically active citizenry, with populism being a longstanding force among the state's political parties. Minnesota has consistently high voter turnout; in the 2008 U.S. presidential election, 77.8% of eligible Minnesotans voted – the highest percentage of any U.S. state or territory – versus the national average of 61.7%. This was due in part to its same day voter registration laws; previously unregistered voters can register on election day, at their polls, with evidence of residency.

In a 2020 study, Minnesota was ranked as the 15th easiest state for citizens to vote in.

Minnesota State Canvassing Board
Recounts in Minnesota are handled by the State Canvassing Board, as needed in the 2008 Senate election between Norm Coleman and Al Franken.

According to the Minnesota Statutes, "the state canvassing board shall consist of the secretary of state, two judges of the supreme court, and two judges of the district court selected by the secretary of state. None of the judges shall be a candidate at the election. If a judge fails to appear at the meeting of the canvassing board, the secretary of state shall fill the vacancy in membership by selecting another judge who is not a candidate at the election. Not more than two judges of the supreme court shall serve on the canvassing board at one time".

See also
 2020 Minnesota elections
 United States presidential elections in Minnesota

References

External links
Elections & Voting at the Minnesota Secretary of State official website

 Digital Public Library of America. Assorted materials related to Minnesota elections
 

 
Government of Minnesota
Political events in Minnesota